Rubina Bajwa is a Canadian actress and sister of Neeru Bajwa who works in Punjabi films. She started her career in 2017 in her sisters film Sargi, for which she was awarded the Debut Female Actress Award in 2018 during the PTC Punjabi Film Awards.

Career 
Bajwa started her career in the 2017 Punjabi film Sargi, promoted and directed by her sister Neeru Bajwa. She then appeared in Laavaan Phere along with Roshan Prince in 2018, which received moderate success at the box office and had received mixed reviews by critics.

In 2019, Bajwa also appeared in Laiye Je Yaarian with Harish Verma and also in the film Munda Hi Chahida. She also had a role in Gidarh Singhi.

Bajwa will be sharing the screen with her sister, Neeru Bajwa in the upcoming movie, Beautiful Billo which is also produced by Neeru's production company and has roles in Teri Meri Gal Ban Gayi, directed by Priti Sapru.

Personal life 

Bajwa was born in a Punjabi family in Vancouver, British Columbia to Jaswant Bajwa and Surinder Bajwa.  She grew up in Vancouver and later came to India to shadow her sister Neeru Bajwa within the Punjabi cinema industry.

In 2019, Bajwa started dating Gurbaksh Chahal. In July 2022, the couple announced their engagement and their plans to be married in October  and on 26 October 2022, they got married with a private ceremony in Mexico.

Filmography

Films

Music video

Awards and nominations

References

External links 

 

Living people
1986 births
Actresses from Vancouver
Actresses in Punjabi cinema
Canadian film actresses
Canadian people of Punjabi descent
Canadian actresses of Indian descent
Canadian expatriate actresses in India
Canadian Sikhs
Punjabi people
21st-century Canadian actresses